Wind shear is a difference in wind speed and direction over a relatively short distance in the atmosphere.

It may also refer to:
 Windshear (comics), a Marvel Comics character
 Windshear, child of Bulletman and Bulletgirl
 Wind Shear's Full Scale, Rolling Road, Automotive Wind Tunnel

See also 
Wind Sheer, a transformer